The Hongjian-12 is a third generation, man-portable, fire-and-forget infrared homing anti-tank missile of China. It was unveiled at the Eurosatory 2014 exhibition.

History 
The missile was first showcased on the Eurosatory 2014 exhibition. Subsequent modifications and improvements were showcased in the following exhibitions. At Airshow China 2016, China North Industries Corporation (Norinco) unveiled HJ-12E, the export variant with new control fins and rocket motors.

On 25 March 2020, Norinco announced its first successful export order to an unknown country.

In July 2021, the HJ-12 was incorporated into People's Liberation Army Ground Force service. The PLA service version is likely based on the latest HJ-12E variant.

Design 

The HJ-12 is a modern, third generation anti-tank missile developed by Norinco. The HJ-12 is a fire-and-forget system utilising lock-on before launch (LOBL) and is capable of being fired within buildings and bunkers due to its soft launch system. Once launched, it will home autonomously onto its target, allowing the operator to immediately take cover or reload to engage another target. Its fire-and-forget technology will reduce the number of anti-tank operators needed on a battlefield. The missile is capable of day/night all-weather operation with its infrared homing, TV imaging dual-mode seeker. The guided missile is capable of engaging armoured vehicles, fortifications, helicopters and boats. When facing non-armoured point targets, bunkers and fortifications, the missile can be fitted with either high-explosive or thermal effect warheads. When engaging enemy tanks and armoured vehicles, the HJ-12 aims to destroy the top of its targets, the more vulnerable point.

The HJ-12 is China's first portable anti-tank missile, increasing the ability of the People's Liberation Army Ground Force to have more modern and mobile infantry forces. It is intended to enable China to match up with anti-tank missile developments made by Western defence companies, like the FGM-148 Javelin and Spike. The missile is also available for export to armies in developing countries that would need to contend with third-generation main battle tanks, but the number of potential buyers is likely small due to its higher cost.

Variants 
HJ-12
Base variant, first unveiled in Airshow China 2014.
HJ-12E
Export designation for HJ-12

Users 

 
 People's Liberation Army Ground Force
 
 Algerian People's National Army
 
 PT Pindad and Norinco signed a Memorandum of Understanding (MoU) regarding the Development of Anti-tank Guided Missile Technology on November 7, 2022
 
 Nigerian Armed Forces

See also 
Red Arrow development
HJ-8 – wire-guided anti-tank missile system
HJ-9 – beam-riding anti-tank missile system
HJ-10 – fiber-optic wire-guided anti-tank missile system
Comparable systems
NLAW
FGM-148 Javelin
OMTAS
Spike
Type 01 LMAT
Missile Moyenne Portée
Related lists
List of anti-tank missiles
List of missiles

References

External links 

 Hongjian-12 / HJ-12 anti-tank missile at GlobalSecurity.org

Anti-tank guided missiles of the People's Republic of China
Fire-and-forget weapons
Military equipment introduced in the 2010s
Norinco